The 3rd Annual TV Week Logie Awards were presented on Saturday 18 March 1961 at Chevron-Hilton Hotel in Sydney. Jimmy Edwards from the BBC series Whack-O! was the Master of Ceremonies. The Awards presentation was televised in a half-hour live broadcast on ABN-2, Sydney, with delayed broadcast on ABC stations in other capital cities during the following week.  This article lists the winners of Logie Awards (Australian television) for 1961:

Awards

Gold Logie
Most Popular Personality on Australian Television
Winner:
Bob Dyer

Special Gold Logie
Best Drama
Winner:
Stormy Petrel, ABC

Logie

National
Best Actor
Winner:
Brian James, Stormy Petrel

Best Variety Show
Winner:
Revue '61, Director Peter Macfarlane, host Digby Wolfe

Best Comedians
Winner:
Bobby Limb and Buster Fiddess

Best Singer
Winner:
Elaine McKenna

Best Australian Drama
Winner:
Shadow of a Pale Horse, ATN-7

Best Sporting Coverage
Winner:
The Davis Cup, ABC

Victoria
Most Popular Male 
Winner:
Graham Kennedy

Most Popular Female 
Winner:
Panda Lisner
 
Most Popular Program
Winner:
In Melbourne Tonight, GTV-9

New South Wales
Most Popular Male 
Winner:
Digby Wolfe

Most Popular Female
Winner:
Tanya Halesworth

Most Popular Program
Winner:
Bobby Limb Show, TCN-9

South Australia
Most Popular Male 
Winner:
Ian Fairweather

Most Popular Female
Winner:
Maree Tomasetti

Most Popular Program 
Winner:
Adelaide Tonight, NWS-9

Queensland
Most Popular Male
Winner:
Brian Tait

Most Popular Female
Winner:
Nancy Knudsen

Most Popular Program
Winner:
The Late Show, BTQ-7

External links

Australian Television: 1959-1961 Logie Awards 
TV Week Logie Awards: 1961

1961 television awards
1961 in Australian television
1961